Galium tinctorium, the stiff marsh bedstraw, is a species of plants in the Rubiaceae. It is widespread and common across the eastern part of North America, from Texas to Labrador and from Minnesota to Florida, plus eastern and central Mexico and the Dominican Republic. It is classed as a noxious weed in some parts of the northeastern United States.

Galium tinctorium is a reclining herb with whorls of narrowly lanceolate leaves. Flowers have 3 petals each instead of the usual 4 more common in the genus. Petals are white in color with tips that are pointed or blunt. It grows in woods, wet ditches, and along shores.

References

External links

Photo of herbarium specimen at Missouri Botanical Garden, collected in Missouri, Galium tinctorium
US Department of Agriculture plants profile
Go Botany, New England Wildflower  Society, stiff three-petaled bedstraw
Illinois Wildflowers, stiff bedstraw
Michigan Flora, stiff bedstraw

tinctorium
Flora of Canada
Flora of Mexico
Flora of the Dominican Republic
Flora of the United States
Plants described in 1753
Taxa named by Carl Linnaeus
Flora without expected TNC conservation status